Baptiste Martin (born 14 May 1985) is a French football defender who last played for Clermont Foot.

Career
Martin was born in Troyes. In the 2008–09 season he played on loan for Clermont Foot from Auxerre. In May 2010 he left Auxerre to sign a two-year deal with K.V. Kortrijk. He played over 100 league matches for the Belgian Pro League club in the years 2010–14. On 12 June 2014, he rejoined his former club Clermont on a three-year deal.

References

1985 births
Living people
Sportspeople from Troyes
Association football defenders
French footballers
French expatriate footballers
AJ Auxerre players
Clermont Foot players
K.V. Kortrijk players
Ligue 1 players
Ligue 2 players
Belgian Pro League players
Expatriate footballers in Belgium
Footballers from Grand Est
French expatriate sportspeople in Belgium